Natty Dread is the seventh album by Bob Marley and the Wailers, released in 1974. Previously Marley had recorded with Peter Tosh and Bunny Wailer as the Wailers, and this was his first record without them.

Natty Dread was most popularly received in the UK, where it peaked at No. 43 and sold in excess of 100,000 copies, making it a gold album. Over time it gained popularity in other parts of the world, and in 2003 it was ranked No. 181 on Rolling Stone magazine's list of the 500 greatest albums of all time.

Content 

Natty Dread is a spiritually charged political and social statement. It opens with a blues-influenced positive celebration of skanking, reggae and sex, "Lively Up Yourself". The original and still unreleased demo of the Island version of "Lively Up Yourself" was recorded in 1973.

"No Woman, No Cry", the second track, is probably the best known recording on the album. It is a nostalgic remembrance of growing up in the impoverished streets of Trenchtown, the ghetto of Kingston, Jamaica, and the happiness brought by the company of friends. The song has been performed by artists as diverse as Boney M. (sung by Liz Mitchell), The Fugees, Pearl Jam, Jimmy Buffett, Rancid and Gilberto Gil. Songwriting credit for "No Woman, No Cry" went to V. Ford. Vincent Ford, better known as "Tartar" to his friends and neighbors, had been a kind friend of Marley as a child in Trenchtown. Marley claimed he would have starved to death on several occasions as a child if not for the aid of Tartar. The original version of the song was in gospel style, featuring Peter Tosh and some unknown female backing vocals and was cut for Island in 1973.

"Them Belly Full (But We Hungry)" is a warning against allowing a nation's poor to go hungry, with the prophetic warning "a hungry mob is an angry mob", while "Talkin' Blues" and "Revolution" go deeper into controversial political commentary.  "Rebel Music (3 O'Clock Roadblock)" is a reflection on the potential impact of reggae music on Jamaican society. The song was written after Marley had been stopped by a night-time police carcheck. The influence of Marley's increasing devotion to Rastafari can be heard in religious-themed songs like "So Jah S'eh", "Natty Dread" and "Lively Up Yourself", while Marley's reputation as a romantic is confirmed with smooth, seductive songs like "Bend Down Low". The title track of the album takes its title from an idealised personification of the Rastafari movement, Natty Dread.

Song writing credits 
Although the album's liner notes list multiple songwriters, including family friends and band members, all songs were written by Marley. Marley was involved in a contractual dispute with his former publishing company, Cayman Music.

Vincent Ford, a childhood friend from Jamaica, was given writing credit for "No Woman, No Cry", as well as the songs "Crazy Baldheads" (with Marley's wife Rita), "Positive Vibration" and "Roots Rock Reggae" from the 1976 album Rastaman Vibration, along with "Inna De Red" and "Jah Bless" with Marley's son, Stephen.

Marley had not wanted his new songs to be associated with Cayman and it had been speculated, including in his obituary in The Independent, that he had put them in the names of his close friends and family members as a means of avoiding the contractual restrictions and as a way to "provide lasting help to family and close friends".

Marley's former manager Danny Sims sued to obtain royalty and ownership rights to the songs, claiming that Marley had actually written the songs but had assigned the credit to Ford to avoid meeting commitments made in prior contracts. A 1987 court decision sided with the Marley estate, which assumed full control of the songs.

Release
Natty Dread was released 25 October 1974 by Island and Tuff Gong.

In 1975, this album was mentioned in a few audio magazines as being ready to be released on Quadraphonic 8-track tape. This never happened. However, the Quadraphonic mixes of "Lively Up Yourself" and "No Woman No Cry" have been bootlegged from the master tapes and are available on the internet.

In 2001, a re-mastered edition of Natty Dread was released by Universal Records containing a bonus track.

Reception and legacy

Released in the US in May 1975, the album reached the top half of the Billboard 200 at No. 92. When it was released in the UK in October 1975 it did much better, reaching No. 43.

In 2003, the album was ranked No. 181 on Rolling Stone magazine's list of the 500 Greatest Albums of All Time, maintaining the rating in a 2012 revised list. The album was also included in the book 1001 Albums You Must Hear Before You Die.

Track listing

Original album (1974)

Personnel 
Bob Marley and the Wailers
 Bob Marley – lead vocals, rhythm guitar
 Aston Barrett – bass guitar
 Carlton Barrett – drums, percussion
 Bernard "Touter" Harvey – piano, organ
 Jean Roussel – Hammond organ, keyboards, arranger on "No Woman No Cry", "Natty Dread" and "Lively Up Yourself"
 Al Anderson – lead guitar
with:
 The I–Threes (Rita Marley, Judy Mowatt, Marcia Griffiths) – backing vocals
 Lee Jaffe - harmonica
Technical
 Sylvan Morris – engineer
 Phil Ault – engineer
 Sid Bucknor - mixer
 Chris Blackwell – producer
 The Wailers – producers
 Tony Wright – cover art

References 

Bob Marley and the Wailers albums
Island Records albums
1974 albums
Albums produced by Chris Blackwell
Tuff Gong albums